Zalmoxis is a genus of harvestmen, within the Zalmoxidae family. They are found in tropical Australia, Borneo, New Guinea, the Philippines and on Pacific islands.

Species

References

Harvestmen
Arthropods of Oceania